Our Lady Immaculate Church (formerly the Church of the Immaculate Conception) is a Roman Catholic Parish church in Chelmsford, Essex, England. It was founded in 1845, opened in 1847 and designed by Joseph John Scoles. It is situated on New London Road, next to Our Lady Immaculate Primary School, close to the junction with Anchor Street, in the city centre. It is served by the Premonstratensians (also known as the Norbertines) from their only community in the UK, St. Philip's Priory.

History

Foundation
In 1840, the site for the church was bought. It was purchased from Charles King, the father of the first mission priest to the area. In 1845, the mission to Catholic population in Chelmsford was founded.

Construction
In October 1847, the church was opened by the then Vicar Apostolic of the London District, Nicholas Wiseman. In 1850, he became Archbishop of Westminster and a cardinal. The church was originally dedicated to the Immaculate Conception. The architect was Joseph John Scoles. The main benefactors of the church were Charles King and William Petre, 12th Baron Petre. It was Lord Petre who chose Scoles to design the church. The church was built in the Gothic Revival style by the builders, Messrs Curtis of Stratford. The Lady altar in the church was originally in Thorndon Hall, home of Lord Petre. The east window in the church was made in Newcastle upon Tyne by Thomas Dunn and inspired by a design of Augustus Pugin.

Developments
In 1973, the church was reordered and extended. A new altar was consecrated by the Bishop of Brentwood, Patrick Casey. In 1982, the church's dedication was changed the Immaculate Conception to Our Lady Immaculate. In 1985, the present organ was installed. It was brought from a United Reformed Church in Felsted. In 1988, the crucifix hanging over the altar in front of the nave was installed, it was designed by William Gordon.

Parish

Since 2008, the church has been served by the  Order of Canons Regular of Prémontré, also known as the Premonstratensians or Norbertines, from St. Philip's Priory. They also serve another parish, Holy Name Church in Chelmsford. Holy Name Church was built in 1965 and is on the corner of Lucas Avenue and Gloucester Avenue in the Moulsham Lodge area of Chelmsford. Holy Name Church has two Sunday Masses: 6:00pm on Saturday and 10:30am on Sunday.

Our Lady Immaculate Church has three Sunday Masses: 9:00am, 12:00pm and 7:00pm.

Interior

See also
 Roman Catholic Diocese of Brentwood

References

External links

 Chelmsford Catholic Parishes site

Our Lady Immaculate
Roman Catholic churches in Essex
Gothic Revival architecture in Essex
Gothic Revival church buildings in England
Roman Catholic churches completed in 1847
1845 establishments in England
Premonstratensian Order
19th-century Roman Catholic church buildings in the United Kingdom